Can You Hear the Laughter? The Story of Freddie Prinze is a 1979 American made-for-television biographical drama film of the life of stand-up comedian and actor Freddie Prinze (portrayed by Ira Angustain). The teleplay by Dalene Young is based on a Playboy magazine article entitled "Good Night Sweet Prinze" by Peter S. Greenberg. The film was made without the cooperation of Prinze's mother or widow.

Plot
At 19, Freddie Prinze (Ira Angustain) exploded on the entertainment scene. With the help of his friend, comedian David Brenner (Ken Sylk), Freddie's career catapulted from second-rate clubs in Manhattan to a prime time stardom on the 1970s television sitcom Chico and the Man as well as sell-out crowds in Las Vegas.
 
Although Freddie had fame, fortune, women, the leap into overnight stardom also brought with it a new set of problems. Freddie looked for love and approval in any way he could, but happiness and satisfaction eluded him. Finding no one to understand him, he turned inward and deeper into drugs.

Cast
Ira Angustain as Freddie Prinze
Kevin Hooks as Nat Blake
Randee Heller as Carol
Julie Carmen as Rose
Ken Sylk as David Brenner
Devon Ericson as Kathy
Stephen Elliott as Jonas
James Callahan as Producer
Mike Binder as Alan Bursky
Annette Charles as Billy

Production
The budget was $1.3 million.

References

External links
Film page at IMDb

1979 television films
1979 films
1970s biographical drama films
American biographical drama films
Biographical films about actors
American films based on actual events
CBS network films
Films set in the 1970s
Films directed by Burt Brinckerhoff
Films about suicide
Films about comedians
American drama television films
1970s American films